Monthaven, also known as the Leonard B. Fite House, is a historic home in Hendersonville, Tennessee and is on the National Historic Register. It was built around 1860 and used as a field hospital during the American Civil War. A few skirmishes occurred on the property as well.  The historic building is now home to galleries and offices of the Hendersonville Arts Council.

During its time, Monthaven was considered a neighbor to Rock Castle and The Hermitage, both miles away.

References
"Tennessee - Sumner County." National Register of Historic Places. 21 March 2008.

External links
 Hendersonville Arts Council

Houses in Sumner County, Tennessee
Tennessee in the American Civil War
Houses on the National Register of Historic Places in Tennessee
Art museums and galleries in Tennessee
Tourist attractions in Sumner County, Tennessee
Houses completed in 1860
Greek Revival houses in Tennessee
Victorian architecture in Tennessee
National Register of Historic Places in Sumner County, Tennessee